Burton W. Chace (July 6, 1901 – August 22, 1972) served for nearly twenty years on the Los Angeles County Board of Supervisors.

Biography
Burton W. Chace was born in Nebraska. On March 20, 1953, Governor Earl Warren appointed him to the Los Angeles County Board of Supervisors following the death of Supervisor Raymond V. Darby. Chace was elected to the remainder of the term in 1954 and elected to four full terms. He served until his death in an automobile accident on August 22, 1972, just before his fourth full term would have expired.

Prior to his appointment as a Los Angeles County supervisor, he served as Mayor of Long Beach, California from 1947 until 1953.

Burton W. Chace Park in Marina del Rey is named after him.

References

1901 births
1972 deaths
Mayors of Long Beach, California
Los Angeles County Board of Supervisors
20th-century American politicians